Nur ol Din (also Romanized as Nūr ol Dīn and Nūr od Dīn; also known as Nūreddīn) is a village in Chenaran Rural District, in the Central District of Chenaran County, Razavi Khorasan Province, Iran. At the 2006 census, its population was 265, in 82 families.

References 

Populated places in Chenaran County